1975 World Association of Veteran Athletes Championships is the first in a series of World Outdoor Championships (also called World Masters Track and Field Championships).

The first international athletics (track and field) competitions for older athletes had taken place in 1972, when the United States Masters International Track Team (USMITT) and the Canadian Masters International Track Team (CMITT) organized a tour of Europe along with Australian and European athletes.

The minimum age limit for this tour was 40 years, all men, with athletes divided into 10-year age groups called Veterans (now called Masters).

This tour was called the "Olympic Tour" since it coincided with the 1972 Summer Olympics in Munich.

Following the success of this tour, the CMITT organized the first Championships in this series under the sponsorship of Canadian National Exhibition (CNE).

This inaugural Championships took place in Toronto, Canada, from 11 to 16 August 1975.

The main venue was Centennial Park Stadium in the Etobicoke district of Toronto,

while Cross Country was held in Sunnybrook Park.

The minimum age limit was 40 years for men and 35 years for women for this first Championships, with age groups of 5-year divisions for men and 10-year divisions for women.

Younger athletes competed in the age group 30-39: Class 0 for men and Class 0W for women.

In meetings at the University of Toronto during the competitions, the World Association of Veteran Athletes (WAVA) was proposed as a governing body to organize future Championships in the series.

A Local Organising Committee (LOC) would work in coordination with WAVA in running the Championships; the 1975 LOC was CMITT led by Don Farquharson,

Farquharson would be elected WAVA president during General Assembly at the 1977 Championships.

WAVA was renamed World Masters Athletics (WMA) at the 2001 Championships in Brisbane, Australia.

In addition to a full range of track and field events,

non-stadia events included 10K Cross Country, 25K Race Walk, and Marathon.

Controversy
The Canadian government attempted to ban South African and Rhodesian athletes due to the apartheid policy of their governments at that time, threatening to withdraw financial support if those athletes participated.

After much discussion, those athletes were allowed to compete as individuals and not as members of the  national team. A 5-member Yugoslavia team pulled out in protest of the South Africans participation. Anne McKenzie was a notable South African athlete, winning 4 gold medals.

Results
Past Championships results are archived at WMA.

Additional archives are available from Museum of Masters Track & Field

as a pdf book.

With over 1,400 individual participants and 5,000 starts, this claimed to be the largest track and field meet ever held in North American to that point in time.

Among the notable performances, Jack Greenwood, Al Guidet, and Theo Orr had 4 victories, and Norm Bright had 3. Bright would suffer a car accident in 1978 that caused near blindness, but he would continue to compete in the Championships at least until 1981.

Results for 1975 are from Museum of Masters Track & Field pdf book unless otherwise noted.

References

External links
Results of Toronto 1975 - masterstrack.com

World Veterans Championships
World Veteran Athletes Championships
World Veteran Athletes Championships
August 1975 sports events in Canada
World Masters Athletics Championships
International track and field competitions hosted by Canada
Masters athletics (track and field) records